Mikhail Davidovich Romm  (born 1891, Vladimir, Imperial Russia – 22 October 1967, Shymkent, Kazakhstan) was a football player in the Soviet Union. He wrote the book I Support Spartak (1965), which contained memoirs of his life as a footballer.

References

External links
 
 Профиль на сайте «Сборная России по футболу»

1891 births
1967 deaths
Soviet footballers
Soviet sports journalists
People from Vladimir, Russia
ACF Fiorentina players
Gulag detainees
Jewish Gulag detainees
Soviet football managers
Moscow State University alumni
Soviet male writers
Association football defenders
Russian Jews
Soviet Jews